Garnett Tarr (born 2 July 2000) is a South African cricketer. He made his first-class debut for Northern Cape in the 2018–19 CSA 3-Day Provincial Cup on 28 February 2019. He made his List A debut for Northern Cape in the 2018–19 CSA Provincial One-Day Challenge on 24 March 2019.

References

External links
 

2000 births
Living people
South African cricketers
Northern Cape cricketers
Place of birth missing (living people)